Gustavo Saba born July 24, 1979, is a rally driver from Paraguay who currently competes in the Codasur South American Rally Championship as well as the Argentine round of the World Rally Championship. He made his WRC debut during the 2012 Rally Argentina and at the 2015 rally scored his first ever WRC points.

Career results

IRC results

WRC results

WRC-2 results

References

External links
Profile at eWRC-Results.com

1979 births
Living people
World Rally Championship drivers
Paraguayan rally drivers